Nelliyampathy (also spelled as Nelliampathi) is a hill station, located  from Palakkad, state of Kerala, India.''

Geography
 Nelliampathy is surrounded by tea and coffee plantations.   
 The village has its own gram panchayat and forms a part of the Chittur taluk. Pothundi Dam, which was constructed in the 19th century, is the entrance to Nelliyampathy.

Seetharkundu
A viewpoint called Seethargund is situated 8 km away from Nelliyampathy.  Seethargund, according to beliefs is the place where Lord Rama, Laxmana and Seetha rested during their exile.

Kesavan Rock
Another attraction of Nelliyampathy is Kesavanpara viewpoint. The film Mrigaya starring Mammootty was shot here.

Demographics
 India census, Nelliyampathy had a population of 8,718 with 4,358 males and 4360 females.

Gallery

See also
 Pothundi Dam

References

External links

 Silent Valley model eco-tourism proposed to save Nelliampathy Hills
 

Villages in Palakkad district
Tourist attractions in Palakkad district
Gram panchayats in Palakkad district
Geography of Palakkad district
